Mason Bogie locomotives (also known as Mason Fairlie locomotives) are a type of articulated steam locomotive suited for sharp curves and uneven track, once commonly used on narrow-gauge railways in the United States. The design is a development of the Single Fairlie locomotive.

Concept and Development
The American licensee of the Fairlie Patent steam locomotive was the firm of William Mason, located in Taunton, Massachusetts. Mason's first Fairlie locomotive was the Janus, an  Double Fairlie built in 1871.

It became obvious that for all the Double Fairlie locomotive's advantages, its disadvantages outweighed them. In 1869, a Single Fairlie locomotive  had been designed and constructed by Alexander McDonnell for the Great Southern and Western Railway in Ireland. This had a single boiler with one articulated, powered truck beneath it and a second, unpowered truck beneath the cab and bunker. Mason developed this design, which he called the Mason Bogie (bogie is the British term for truck in the railroad sense). His first locomotive was the Onward a  gauge 0-4-4T built in 1872.

The Mason Bogie was still, however, plagued by one of the biggest problems of the Fairlie - the jointed steam pipes to the driven truck leaked far too much steam. Mason eventually changed to a different scheme, in which the pivot point for the leading truck became a hollow ball joint through which the live steam for the cylinders passed.  Mason also developed a sliding seal for the exhaust from the moving cylinder saddle into the smoke box. Although better, Mason's improvements took up much valuable space in between the driving wheels, forcing Mason to use an outside valve gear, generally the Walschaerts valve gear. Additionally, the reversing shaft had to be mounted atop the boiler, with a long lifting link dropping down to the radius rod, a feature unique to Mason Bogies (this was necessary because the lifting link would swing to the side as the truck pivoted, lifting the radius rod and changing the valve setting.  Lengthening the link, and thus increasing the radius of its swing, minimized the amount of change).

Production and Service
Approximately 146 Mason Bogies were produced by William Mason's firm between 1871 and 1890 when the firm built its last locomotive, of which 88 or so were narrow gauge units, the rest being standard gauge. This was about half the firm's total output of locomotives during this period. Major buyers included the Boston, Revere Beach and Lynn Railroad, a suburban carrier which owned 32, the Denver, South Park and Pacific Railroad, a Colorado common-carrier railroad which owned 23, and the New York and Manhattan Beach Railroad, another suburban carrier, which ran seventeen locomotives of this pattern.

The best-known locomotives were those on the Denver, South Park & Pacific, who rostered fairly large Mason Bogies (mostly of 2-6-6 and 2-8-6 wheel arrangements), and had a lot of success with them. Some of these locomotives were later sold to the Burlington and Northwestern Railway, a CB&Q subsidiary in Iowa. Another problem with the Fairlie design showed itself in Colorado, the surprisingly poor tracking of the powered bogie. It would both hunt, or wander, when on straight track, yet provide more resistance to turning when it hit curvature than might be thought. This manifested itself in much greater wear on wheels and track than might have been expected.

The Boston, Revere Beach and Lynn Railroad continued to purchase Mason Bogies even after the closure of the William Mason factory, ordering similar locomotives from other builders as late as 1914 and operating them until electrification in 1928.

Surviving
At least one Mason Bogie, Torch Lake, survives, at Greenfield Village (part of The Henry Ford) in Dearborn, Michigan, a standard gauge 0-6-4. It was built in 1873 and still carries passengers during the summer months.

Similar Designs
Superficially similar to the Mason Bogie is another design, the Forney locomotive. Like the Mason Bogie, the Forney has powered axles under the boiler and a trailing truck under the rear bunker and tank behind the cab. However, the Forney's driving wheels are fixed in the frame, rather than articulated. They were reasonably popular, particularly on elevated railroads.

See also

 Articulated locomotive
 Bogie
 Mason Machine Works
 Narrow gauge

References

Articulated locomotives
0-6-6 locomotives
2-4-4T locomotives